Jefferson County is a county in Montana, United States. As of the 2020 census, the population was 12,085. Its county seat is Boulder. The county was created in 1865 and named for President Thomas Jefferson.

Jefferson County is part of the Helena, MT Micropolitan Statistical Area.

Geography

Major highways

  Interstate 15
  Interstate 90
  U.S. Highway 12
  U.S. Highway 287
  Montana Highway 2
  Montana Highway 41
  Montana Highway 55
  Montana Highway 69

Adjacent counties

 Lewis and Clark County - north
 Broadwater County - east
 Gallatin County - southeast
 Madison County - south
 Silver Bow County - west
 Deer Lodge County - west
 Powell County - northwest

National protected areas
 Deerlodge National Forest (part)
 Helena National Forest (part)

Politics

Demographics

2000 census
As of the 2000 United States census, there were 10,049 people, 3,747 households, and 2,847 families in the county. The population density was 6 people per square mile (2/km2). There were 4,199 housing units at an average density of 2 per square mile (1/km2). The racial makeup of the county was 96.07% White, 0.14% Black or African American, 1.26% Native American, 0.42% Asian, 0.07% Pacific Islander, 0.38% from other races, and 1.66% from two or more races. 1.48% of the population were Hispanic or Latino of any race. 22.9% were of German, 13.1% English, 12.9% Irish, 7.9% Norwegian and 5.3% American ancestry.

There were 3,747 households, out of which 35.60% had children under the age of 18 living with them, 67.10% were married couples living together, 5.90% had a female householder with no husband present, and 24.00% were non-families. 20.20% of all households were made up of individuals, and 7.30% had someone living alone who was 65 years of age or older. The average household size was 2.62 and the average family size was 3.03.

The county population contained 27.80% under the age of 18, 5.20% from 18 to 24, 26.80% from 25 to 44, 29.90% from 45 to 64, and 10.30% who were 65 years of age or older. The median age was 40 years. For every 100 females, there were 100.80 males. For every 100 females age 18 and over, there were 100.40 males.

The median income for a household in the county was $41,506, and the median income for a family was $48,912. Males had a median income of $34,753 versus $25,011 for females. The per capita income for the county was $18,250. About 6.70% of families and 9.00% of the population were below the poverty line, including 10.40% of those under age 18 and 9.60% of those age 65 or over.

2010 census
As of the 2010 United States census, there were 11,406 people, 4,512 households, and 3,301 families residing in the county. The racial makeup of the county was 95.5% white, 1.4% American Indian, 0.4% Asian, 0.1% black or African American, 0.4% from other races, and 2.2% from two or more races. Those of Hispanic or Latino origin made up 2.0% of the population. In terms of ancestry, 31.3% were German, 19.1% were Irish, 17.2% were English, 10.8% were Norwegian, and 4.2% were American.

Of the 4,512 households, 28.8% had children under the age of 18 living with them, 63.7% were married couples living together, 5.4% had a female householder with no husband present, 26.8% were non-families, and 22.6% of all households were made up of individuals. The average household size was 2.48 and the average family size was 2.90. The median age was 46.2 years.

The median income for a household in the county was $56,695 and the median income for a family was $67,195. Males had a median income of $50,978 versus $34,148 for females. The per capita income for the county was $26,437. About 2.7% of families and 12.8% of the population were below the poverty line, including 5.1% of those under age 18 and 8.6% of those age 65 or over.

Communities

Towns
 Boulder (county seat)
 Whitehall

Census-designated places

 Basin
 Cardwell
 Clancy (includes Alhambra)
 Elkhorn
 Jefferson City
 Montana City
 Rader Creek
 South Hills

Unincorporated communities

 Amazon
 Bernice
 Corbin
 Elk Park
 Homestake
 Leadville
 La Hood Park
 Louisville
 Pappas Place
 Paul Place
 Piedmont
 Pipestone
 Renova

Former communities
 Comet
 Wickes

See also

 List of counties in Montana
 List of lakes in Jefferson County, Montana
 List of mountains in Jefferson County, Montana
 National Register of Historic Places listings in Jefferson County, Montana

References

External links

 

 
Montana counties
1865 establishments in Montana Territory
Helena, Montana micropolitan area
Populated places established in 1865